Jacques Mouvet (born 16 December 1912, date of death unknown) was a Belgian bobsledder. He won a silver medal in the four-man event at the 1948 Winter Olympics in St. Moritz and finished fourth in the two-man event at those same games. Mouvet also earned two medals at the 1947 FIBT World Championships in St. Moritz with a silver in the four-man and a bronze in the two-man event.

When competing in two-man events, Mouvet was the brakesman of Max Houben. During a practice run at the 1949 FIBT World Championships, their sled catapulted off of "shady" corner at the Lake Placid bobsleigh, luge, and skeleton track. Houben was killed instantly while Mouvet survived with a broken skull and a serious back injury.

References

External links
1948 bobsleigh two-man results
Bobsleigh four-man Olympic medalists for 1924, 1932–56, and since 1964
Bobsleigh two-man world championship medalists since 1931
Bobsleigh four-man world championship medalists since 1930
DatabaseOlympics.com profile
Retrospective on Max Houben

Belgian male bobsledders
Bobsledders at the 1948 Winter Olympics
Year of death missing
1912 births
Olympic medalists in bobsleigh
Medalists at the 1948 Winter Olympics
Olympic silver medalists for Belgium